The Embassy of the Lao People's Democratic Republic in Moscow is the diplomatic mission of Laos in the Russian Federation. It is located at 18 Malaya Nikitskaya Street in the Presnensky District of Moscow.

See also 
 Laos–Russia relations
 Diplomatic missions in Russia

References

External links 
 Embassy of Laos in Moscow

Laos–Russia relations
Laos
Moscow